Euxestocis is a genus of tree-fungus beetles in the family Ciidae.

Species
 Euxestocis bicornutus Miyatake, 1954
 Euxestocis formosanus Miyatake, 1982

References

Ciidae genera